(1887–1975) was a Japanese zoologist, palaeontologist, and archaeologist, and a recipient of the Imperial Academy Prize.

Biography
Born in Meiji 20 (1887), Matsumoto graduated from the Department of Zoology, Tokyo Imperial University, in 1911. From 1914 to 1933 he taught at Tohoku Imperial University, initially as a lecturer, then from 1922 as professor. From 1955, he was professor of biology at Fukushima Medical University, where he taught basic medicine. In 1921, he was awarded the Imperial Academy Prize in recognition of his work on brittle stars (Ophiuroidea). His contributions to the field of vertebrate palaeontology include descriptions of the Akebono elephant (Stegodon aurorae) and Hanaizumi bison (Bison hanaizumiensis), while as an archaeologist he helped develop typologies of Jōmon ceramics. Matsumoto died in 1975.

References

External links
 Matsumoto Hikoshichirō (Japan Paleobiology Database)

Japanese paleontologists
1887 births
1975 deaths